Zaborowski (feminine Zaborowska) is a Polish surname. Notable people include:

 Albrycht Zaborowski (1638–1711), Polish nobleman of Ducal Prussia
 Cathrine Zaborowski (born 1971), former Norwegian football player
 Filip Zaborowski (born 1994), Polish swimmer
 Ignacy Zaborowski (1754–1803), Polish mathematician and geodesist
 Tymon Zaborowski (1799–1828), Polish poet
 Zbyszek Zaborowski (born 1958), Polish politician

 Glinik Zaborowski, village in the administrative district of Gmina Strzyżów, within Strzyżów County, Subcarpathian Voivodeship, in south-eastern Poland

Polish-language surnames